I Crush Bozo is an album by the band Happy Flowers, released in 1988.

Track listing
"Get Me off the Broiler Pan" - 2:54
"I'm the Stupid One" - 2:29
"More Mittens" - 1:22
"Old Relatives" - 2:22
"Get Paul's Head" - 1:34
"Why Don't I Bleed" - 2:09
"Fever Dream" - 2:44
"They Cleaned My Cut Out With a Wire Brush" - 3:55
"I've Got the Picnic Disease" - 3:45
"Jellyfish Head" - 2:22
"There's a Worm in My Hand" - 2:31
"Know" - 0:49
"Toenail Fear" - 2:22
"Mrs. Butcher" - 2:51
"My Frisbee Went Under a Lawnmower" - 2:47
"I Saw My Picture on a Milk Carton" - 2:30

Personnel
John Beers ("Horribly Charred Infant") - vocals, guitars, drums, piano on track 13
Charlie Kramer ("Mr. Anus") - guitar, bass, drums, vocals, Casio keyboards on track 14

References

Happy Flowers albums
1988 albums